Jardines is a rapid transit station in San Juan agglomeration, Puerto Rico. It is located between Deportivo and Torrimar stations on the sole line of the Tren Urbano system, in Bayamón. The station is located in Juan Sánchez barrio, close to the municipal border with Guaynabo, and it is named after the Jardines de Caparra neighborhood, located nearby. The trial service ran in 2004, however, the regular service only started on 6 June 2005.

Nearby 
 Jardines de Caparra neighborhood
 Valle del Sol neighborhood
 Riviera Tennis Center

References

Tren Urbano stations
Railway stations in the United States opened in 2004
2004 establishments in Puerto Rico